Mariaba convoluta is a moth in the family Geometridae. It is found on Borneo, Lombok, Sulawesi and in Burma and the north-eastern Himalayas. The habitat consists of lowland alluvial and hill dipterocarp forests.

References

Moths described in 1866
Eupitheciini